Donald Michael Maloney (born September 5, 1958) is a Canadian ice hockey executive and former player. He is currently the Vice President of Hockey Operations for the Calgary Flames. He was formerly the general manager of the Phoenix/Arizona Coyotes. He played for the New York Rangers for parts of eleven seasons. In addition, he played with his brother Dave Maloney while with the Rangers.

Playing career
Maloney was traded to the Hartford Whalers during the 1988–89 season. He also played for the Rangers' perennial rivals, the New York Islanders, from 1989 to 1991.

Post-playing career
He served as the Islanders' general manager from 1992 to 1995. Maloney served as the Rangers' vice president of player personnel and was also as assistant general manager to Glen Sather from 1996 to 2007. On May 28, 2007, he was named general manager of the Phoenix Coyotes.

In the 2009 book 100 Ranger Greats, the authors ranked Maloney at No. 26 all-time of the 901 New York Rangers who had played during the team’s first 82 seasons.

On June 2, 2010, Maloney was named the NHL's General Manager of the Year, making him the first ever recipient of the award.

At the conclusion of the 2015–16 season, the Arizona Coyotes relieved Maloney of his duties as general manager.

On August 17, 2016, Maloney was hired as a professional scout for the Calgary Flames.

Career statistics

Regular season and playoffs

International

References

External links

1958 births
Living people
Arizona Coyotes executives
Calgary Flames executives
Calgary Flames scouts
Canadian ice hockey forwards
Hartford Whalers players
Ice hockey people from Ontario
Kitchener Rangers players
National Hockey League All-Stars
National Hockey League executives
National Hockey League general managers
New Haven Nighthawks players
New York Islanders executives
New York Islanders players
New York Rangers draft picks
New York Rangers executives
New York Rangers players
San Jose Sharks scouts
Sportspeople from Kawartha Lakes